The Dodge Meadowbrook is a full-size car that was produced by Dodge in the United States from 1949 to 1954.

History
The Dodge Meadowbrook was produced by Dodge and offered as the midline trim level from February 1949 until 1954, above the Wayfarer and beneath the Coronet. The Meadowbrook was largely identical to the Coronet, excepting trim and equipment differences. In 1952 the Wayfarer was cancelled and the Meadowbrook became the lowest-priced Dodge in the United States; export markets (including Canada) continued to receive the Plymouth-based Dodge Kingsway.

1949
In its first year the four-door only Meadowbrook made up 30% of Dodge's sales (about 90,000 units), and came with "Safe-Guard Hydraulic Brakes" which included two cylinders per front brake. Dodge also advertised a new "cradled" ride, which was supposedly softer than all the others makers cars. The single-barrel inline-six produced .

1950
For 1950, the six-cylinder was baptized the "Get-Away" engine. After the late introduction of the 1949s, the 1950 Dodges appeared a little earlier, on 4 January 1950. The 1950 Meadowbrook has a wide,  turning circle. Four-door sedan bodywork remained the only option.

1951
The 1951 Meadowbrook received a thorough change, with all-new front skin. Bumpers were also new, as was the dashboard, and the windshield was enlarged. The engine remained unchanged, as it would until 1954.

1952
In 1952, the Meadowbrook made up 32.50% of Dodge's sales (circa 84,000). With Chrysler being entirely focussed on the Korean War effort, the 1952s received almost no changes - modifications being limited to details such as a red reflector dot beneath the taillights and lightly redesigned hubcaps. The 1952s were introduced on 10 November 1951.

1953
The 1953 Dodges arrived on 23 October 1952, and featured a revised bodywork based on the 1952s. The doors (now with pull-handles) opened wider, the rear window was a one-piece, and the taillights were oval units. Naturally the grille and chrome applications were altered. The "Meadowbrook Special" series was added to replace the Wayfarer at the lower end of Dodge's lineup. A two-door model and a station wagon were also added. The two- and four-door sedans were both offered in both Meadowbrook and Special trim levels, but the Special did not suit the buoyant US car market and by April 1953 it had already been discontinued. Instead, sales of the new V8-engined Coronet were very strong. The austere Special, intended for travelling salesmen and the like, received no chrome side trim and plain rubber trim around the windows. The interior was equally bare.

The two-door Suburban wagon, offered for 1953 only, sat on a shorter  wheelbase than the sedans.

1954
1954 was the last year of the Meadowbrook, and it had a new Powerflite automatic. Offered as a four-door or two-door sedan (called Club Coupé), it was now also available with the optional new "Red Ram" Hemi V8 engine. Of , it produces  for the Meadowbrook, ten horsepower less than in the more senior Dodges due to a lower compression ratio. Buyers still flocked to the more prestigious Coronet and Royal lines, and only 15,444 were built.

See also
Dodge Coronet

References

External links
http://www.oldride.com/library/dodge_meadowbrook.html
https://web.archive.org/web/20071011231413/http://conceptcarz.com/vehicle/z1667/Dodge_Meadowbrook/default.aspx

1950s cars
Rear-wheel-drive vehicles
Coupés
Sedans
Meadowbrook
Full-size vehicles
Station wagons